"Back to Basics" is a song performed by British rapper and songwriter Headie One, featuring vocals from English rapper Skepta. It was released as the third single from Headie One's mixtape Music x Road on 4 July 2019 through Relentless Records. The song peaked at number 42 on the UK Singles Chart.

Music video
A music video to accompany the release of "Back to Basics" was first released onto YouTube on 5 July 2019.

Charts

Release history

References

2019 songs
2019 singles
Headie One songs
Skepta songs
Songs written by Headie One
Songs written by Skepta